Sinomimovelleda is a genus of longhorn beetles of the subfamily Lamiinae, containing the following species:

References

Parmenini